Address the Nation is the third studio album by the Swedish rock group H.E.A.T and first album with the vocalist Erik Grönwall, released in 2012 by the record company Gain/Sony Music. In January 2013, Dave Ling of Classic Rock named Address the Nation the best album of 2012. Sweden Rock Magazine named it the fourth best album of 2012.

Track listing

Personnel
 Erik Grönwall – vocals
 Dave Dalone – guitars
 Eric Rivers – guitars
 Jona Tee – keyboards
 Jimmy Jay – bass
 Crash – drums

Charts

References

H.E.A.T albums
2012 albums